Christina Hansadotter Brask, or Christin Hansadotter (1459 – 5 March 1520), was a Swedish writer and translator, and a member of the Bridgettine Order in Vadstena Abbey.

Biography
Christina Hansadotter became a nun at Vadstena Abbey in 1473. Many nuns were active in translating and copying books, and she also became a writer. She co-wrote the book Gudelika Snillis Väckiare with her colleague Kadrin or Katarina (d. 1519), which was published in the early 16th century, making them the perhaps first female book writers of their country. Kadrin wrote the first half of the book, and Christina the second half. Christina is also identified as the translator of Antiphonarium for the Abbess Margareta Clausdotter, and as the author of Speculum Virginum and Christina Hansdotters bönbok.

References

External links
 "Svenska kyrkans sköna litteratur: eller, Den svensk-kyrkliga litteraturen bedömd med särskildt ..."
Berömda nunnor i Vadstenas historia i Wilhelmina Stålberg, Anteckningar om svenska qvinnor (1864)
 Fornsvenska. Medeltida författare, översättare och skrivare
 Historiskt bibliotek utgifvet af Carl Silfverstolpe
  Vadstena klosters minnesbok [microform] Diarium vazstenense (1918)

1459 births
1520 deaths
Bridgettine nuns
15th-century Swedish women writers
15th-century Swedish writers
15th-century Swedish nuns
16th-century Swedish women writers
16th-century Swedish writers
16th-century Swedish nuns